Orestes Acosta Airport  is a regional airport that serves Moa, a municipality in the Holguín Province of Cuba.

Facilities 

References

External links 
 
 

Airports in Cuba
Airport Oreste Acosta
Buildings and structures in Holguín Province